Von Economo neurons (VENs), also called spindle neurons, are a specific class of mammalian cortical neurons characterized by a large spindle-shaped soma (or body) gradually tapering into a single apical axon (the ramification that transmits signals) in one direction, with only a single dendrite (the ramification that receives signals) facing opposite. Other cortical neurons tend to have many dendrites, and the bipolar-shaped morphology of von Economo neurons is unique here.

Von Economo neurons are found in two very restricted regions in the brains of hominids (humans and other great apes): the anterior cingulate cortex (ACC) and the fronto-insular cortex (FI) (which each make up the salience network). In 2008, they were also found in the dorsolateral prefrontal cortex of humans. Von Economo neurons are also found in the brains of a number of cetaceans, African and Asian elephants, and to a lesser extent in macaque monkeys and raccoons. The appearance of von Economo neurons in distantly related clades suggests that they represent convergent evolutionspecifically, as an adaptation to accommodate the increasing size of these distantly-related animals' brains.

Von Economo neurons were discovered and first described in 1929 by Austrian psychiatrist and neurologist Constantin von Economo (1876–1931).

Name
Von Economo neurons are named after the Austrian neurologist Constantin von Economo, who first described these neurons in 1926.

Function
Von Economo neurons are relatively large cells that may allow rapid communication across the relatively large brains of great apes, elephants, and cetaceans. Although rare in comparison to other neurons, von Economo neurons are abundant, and comparatively large, in humans; they are however three times as abundant in cetaceans.

Evolutionary significance
The discovery of von Economo neurons in diverse whale species has led to the suggestion that they are "a possible obligatory neuronal adaptation in very large brains, permitting fast information processing and transfer along highly specific projections and that evolved in relation to emerging social behaviors." The apparent presence of these specialized neurons only in highly intelligent mammals may be an example of convergent evolution.

Their restriction among the primates to great apes leads to the hypothesis that they developed no earlier than 15–20 million years ago, prior to the divergence of orangutans from the African great apes. Recently, primitive forms of von Economo neurons have also been discovered in macaque monkey brains and raccoons.

In the anterior cingulate cortex
In 1999, American neuroscientist John Allman and colleagues at the California Institute of Technology first published a report on von Economo neurons found in the anterior cingulate cortex (ACC) of hominids but not any other species. Neuronal volumes of ACC von Economo neurons were larger in humans and bonobos than the von Economo neurons of the chimpanzee, gorilla and orangutan.

Allman and his colleagues have delved beyond the level of brain infrastructure to investigate how von Economo neurons function at the superstructural level, focusing on their role as «air traffic controllers for emotions ... at the heart of the human social emotion circuitry, including a moral sense». Allman's team proposes that von Economo neurons help channel neural signals from deep within the cortex to relatively distant parts of the brain. Specifically, Allman's team found signals from the ACC are received in Brodmann's area 10, in the frontal polar cortex, where regulation of cognitive dissonance (disambiguation between alternatives) is thought to occur. According to Allman, this neural relay appears to convey motivation to act, and concerns the recognition of error. Self-controland avoidance of erroris thus facilitated by the executive gatekeeping function of the ACC, as it regulates the interference patterns of neural signals between these two brain regions.

In humans, intense emotion activates the anterior cingulate cortex, as it relays neural signals transmitted from the amygdala (a primary processing center for emotions) to the frontal cortex, perhaps by functioning as a sort of lens to focus the complex texture of neural signal interference patterns. The ACC is also active during demanding tasks requiring judgement and discrimination and when errors are detected by an individual. During difficult tasks, or when experiencing intense love, anger, or lust, activation of the ACC increases. In brain imaging studies, the ACC has specifically been found to be active when mothers hear infants cry, underscoring its role in affording a heightened degree of social sensitivity.

The ACC is a relatively ancient cortical region and is involved with many autonomic functions, including motor and digestive functions, while also playing a role in the regulation of blood pressure and heart rate. Significant olfactory and gustatory capabilities of the ACC and fronto-insular cortex appear to have been usurped, during recent evolution, to serve enhanced roles related to higher cognitionranging from planning and self-awareness to role-playing and deception. The diminished olfactory function of humans, compared to other primates, may be related to the fact that von Economo neurons located at crucial neural network hubs have only two dendrites rather than many, resulting in reduced neurological integration.

In the fronto-insular cortex 

At a Society for Neuroscience meeting in 2003, Allman reported on von Economo neurons his team found in another brain region, the fronto-insular cortex, a region which appears to have undergone significant evolutionary adaptations in mankindperhaps as recently as 100,000 years ago.

This fronto-insular cortex is closely connected to the insula, a region that is roughly the size of a thumb in each hemisphere of the human brain. The insula and fronto-insular cortex are part of the insular cortex, wherein the elaborate circuitry associated with spatial awareness are found, and where self-awareness and the complexities of emotion are thought to be generated and experienced. Moreover, this region of the right hemisphere is crucial to navigation and perception of three-dimensional rotations.

Concentrations

Anterior cingulate cortex 
The largest number of ACC von Economo neurons are found in humans, fewer in the gracile great apes, and fewest in the robust great apes.  In both humans and bonobos they are often found in clusters of 3 to 6 neurons. They are found in humans, chimpanzees, gorillas, orangutans, some cetaceans, and elephants. While total quantities of ACC von Economo neurons were not reported by Allman in his seminal research report (as they were in a later report describing their presence in the frontoinsular cortex, below), his team's initial analysis of the ACC layer V in hominids revealed an average of ~9 von Economo neurons per section for orangutans (rare, 0.6% of section cells), ~22 for gorillas (frequent, 2.3%), ~37 for chimpanzees (abundant, 3.8%), ~68 for bonobos (abundant/clusters, 4.8%), ~89 for humans (abundant/clusters, 5.6%).

Fronto-insular cortex 

All of the primates examined had more von Economo neurons in the fronto-insula of the right hemisphere than in the left. In contrast to the higher number of von Economo neurons found in the ACC of the gracile bonobos and chimpanzees, the number of fronto-insular von Economo neurons was far higher in the cortex of robust gorillas (no data for orangutans was given). An adult human had 82,855 such cells, a gorilla had 16,710, a bonobo had 2,159, and a chimpanzee had a mere 1,808despite the fact that chimpanzees and bonobos are great apes most closely related to humans.

Dorsolateral prefrontal cortex 
Von Economo neurons have been located in the Dorsolateral prefrontal cortex of humans and elephants. In humans they have been observed in higher concentration in Brodmann area 9 (BA9)mostly isolated or in clusters of 2, while in Brodmann area 24 (BA24) they have been found mostly in clusters of 2–4.

Clinical significance
Abnormal von Economo neuron development may be linked to several psychotic disorders, typically those characterized by distortions of reality, disturbances of thought, disturbances of language, and withdrawal from social contact. Altered von Economo neuron states have been implicated in both schizophrenia and autism, but research into these correlations remains at a very early stage. Frontotemporal dementia involves loss of mostly von Economo neurons. An initial study suggested that Alzheimer's disease specifically targeted von Economo neurons; this study was performed with end-stage Alzheimer brains in which cell destruction was widespread, but later it was found that Alzheimer's disease doesn't affect the von Economo neurons.

References

General References

External links
 TaipeiTimes.comKnow Thyself and Others
"Well-wired whales" Michael Balter (2006) ScienceNOW Daily News. 27 November
"Brain Cells for Socializing" Smithsonian, June 2009

Central nervous system neurons